Britta Andersen (born 19 December 1979) is a Danish badminton player. She was born to a Philippine mother and Danish father.

Achievements

World Junior Championships
Girls' doubles

European Junior Championships
Girls' doubles

Mixed doubles

IBF Grand Prix 
The World Badminton Grand Prix sanctioned by International Badminton Federation since 1983.

Women's doubles

Mixed doubles

BWF International Challenge/Series/European Circuit
Women's doubles

Mixed doubles

 BWF International Challenge tournament
 BWF International Series tournament

References

External links
 Profile on Badminton DK
 
 
 

Living people
Danish female badminton players
1979 births
Sportspeople from Aarhus